The Crimson Curtain can refer to:

 Crimson Curtain (1952 film), a 1952 French film
 The Crimson Curtain (1953 film), a 1953 French film